The Hurricane Bertie Stakes is a Grade III American Thoroughbred horse race for fillies and mares that are four years old or older, over a distance of  furlongs on the dirt track held annually in March at Gulfstream Park, Hallandale Beach, Florida.  The event currently carries a purse of $100,000.

History 
The race was inaugurated in 2001 over a shorter distance of 6 furlongs and named after the winning mare Hurricane Bertie who won 14 races in her career including the Grade II Princess Rooney Stakes. The following year the event's distance was increased to six and one-half furlongs.

The event was upgraded to a Grade III event in 2005.

In 2015 the distance the event was increased to 7 furlongs but in 2021 the distance was reverted to  furlongs.

Records
Speed record: 
 7 furlongs – 1:21.45 - Dream Pauline (2019)
  furlongs  – 1:14.68 - Groupie Doll (2014)

Margins: 
  lengths – Merry Meadow (2015)

Most wins by a jockey
 4 - Javier Castellano (2006, 2008, 2011, 2019)

Most wins by a trainer
 4 - H. Allen Jerkens (2004, 2005, 2007, 2009)

Most wins by an owner
 3 - Joseph V. Shields Jr.  (2004, 2007, 2009)

Winners

References

External links
Gulfstream Park

Horse races in the United States
Graded stakes races in the United States
2001 establishments in Florida
Recurring sporting events established in 2001
Flat horse races for four-year-old fillies
Grade 3 stakes races in the United States